Trevor Malcolm Stienburg (pronounced like "Steinberg"; nickname "Stieny" or "Mango", or “Big Mangzy”) (born May 13, 1966) is a former professional ice hockey right winger. He was drafted in the first round, 15th overall, by the Quebec Nordiques in the 1984 NHL Entry Draft. He played seventy-one regular-season games and one playoff game in the National Hockey League, all with the Nordiques.

He went on to coach the Saint Mary's Huskies who play in the Atlantic University Hockey Conference in Canada for 23 years, stepping down in June of 2020.  He coached the team to AUS titles in 2002 and 2009 and to a University Cup title in Thunder Bay, Ontario on March 28, 2010. He was named the U Sports coach of the year three times, including back to back in 1998-99 and 1999-2000. He remains the only coach ever to achieve this feat. 

Since retiring from coaching, Stienburg has joined the Seattle Kraken as an amateur scout.  

Stienburg was born in Kingston, Ontario.

Career statistics

External links

1966 births
Canadian ice hockey right wingers
Fredericton Express players
Guelph Platers players
Halifax Citadels players
Ice hockey people from Ontario
London Knights players
Living people
National Hockey League first-round draft picks
New Haven Nighthawks players
Quebec Nordiques draft picks
Quebec Nordiques players
Sportspeople from Kingston, Ontario
Springfield Indians players